The 1991–92 Algerian Cup is the 29th edition of the Algerian Cup. USM Bel-Abbès are the defending champions, having beaten JS Kabylie 2–0 in the previous season's final.

Round of 64

Round of 32

Round of 16

Quarter-finals

Semi-finals

Final

Match

References

Algerian Cup
Algerian Cup
Algerian Cup